The 2008 Women's EuroFloorball Cup Finals took place in Winterthur, Switzerland from 8 to 12 October 2008.

The 2008 EuroFloorball Cup marks the second year in which the new name for the tournament was used (previously known as the European Cup). The tournament also marks its 16th year.

The IFF decided that the tournament would revert to its original format, and would take place during one calendar year, instead of two.

Qualification Format
Since the top 4 nations at the 2007–08 Women's EuroFloorball Cup were from Switzerland, Sweden, the Czech Republic, and Norway, the top team in that country automatically qualifies, as well as the reigning champion. 5 teams in total receive automatic qualification.

Since 5 of the 8 spots are filled, the other 3 need to be decided using regional qualification. In Group C, the runners-up to the top team in Switzerland, Sweden, the Czech Republic, and Norway play for a spot in the finals. In Groups A and B, the teams are split into regions: West Europe and East Europe, respectively. The winning team in each group advances to the finals, making the total number of teams eight.

To be eligible to take part in the 2008 Women's EuroFloorball Cup, teams that take place in regional qualification must capture the national title in floorball in their country. If that team does not register, then the second-place team can register, and so forth.

Qualifying Venues
Group A qualifications for Western Europe took place in Frederikshavn, Denmark from 14 to 16 August 2008

Group B qualifications for Eastern Europe took place in Bratislava, Slovakia from 27 to 31 August 2008.

Group C qualifications took place in Helsinki, Finland from 22 to 24 August 2008.

Championship results

Preliminary round

Conference A

Conference B

Playoffs

Semi-finals

Bronze-medal match

Championship Match

Placement round

7th-place match

5th-place match

External links
Official Website
2008 Women's EuroFloorball Cup Finals Switzerland – Schedule & Statistics
2008 Women's EuroFloorball Cup Qualifying Denmark – Schedule & Statistics
2008 Women's EuroFloorball Cup Qualifying Slovakia – Schedule & Statistics
2008 Women's EuroFloorball Cup Qualifying Finland – Schedule & Statistics

EuroFloorball Cup
Women's Eurofloorball Cup Finals, 2008
Winterthur